Samuel Aguiar (born 30 December 1968) is a Portuguese rower. He competed in the men's lightweight coxless four event at the 1996 Summer Olympics.

References

External links

1968 births
Living people
Portuguese male rowers
Olympic rowers of Portugal
Rowers at the 1996 Summer Olympics
Place of birth missing (living people)